Hatten Schuyler Yoder, Jr., (March 20, 1921 – August 2, 2003) was a geophysicist and experimental petrologist who conducted pioneering work on minerals under high pressure and temperature. He was noted for his study of silicates and igneous rocks.

Life
Yoder was born in Cleveland, Ohio on March 20, 1921.

Yoder was educated at the University of Chicago and the Massachusetts Institute of Technology. He served as the fourth Director of the Carnegie Institution of Washington's Geophysical Laboratory, from 1971 to 1986. In 1979, he received the Wollaston Medal.

He died on August 2, 2003 at Suburban Hospital in Bethesda, Maryland from sepsis and renal failure.

Awards and recognition
 Member, United States National Academy of Sciences, 1958
 Arthur L. Day Medal, Geological Society of America, 1962
 Wollaston Medal, Geological Society of London, 1979
 Member, American Academy of Arts and Sciences, 1979
 Member, American Philosophical Society, 1979
 Roebling Medal, 1992

Published works

References

Further reading

1921 births
2003 deaths
American geophysicists
University of Chicago alumni
Wollaston Medal winners
Petrologists

Members of the American Philosophical Society